Journey Through a Body is the fourth studio album by industrial music pioneers Throbbing Gristle, released in Germany in April 1982 through record label Walter Ulbricht Schallfolien.

Background 

The album was recorded in Rome in March 1981 in the RAI studios without pre-planning any songs. The work was a piece of "radio art" commissioned by Italian national radio.

Release 

Journey Through a Body was released in Germany in April 1982 through record label Walter Ulbricht Schallfolien. The album was reissued in the UK in 1993.

Critical reception 

The Wire magazine called it the group's "scariest" album.

Track listing

References 

Throbbing Gristle albums
1982 albums